The Douro Formation is a geologic formation in Nunavut. It preserves fossils dating back to the Silurian period.

See also

 List of fossiliferous stratigraphic units in Nunavut

References
 

Silurian Nunavut
Silurian southern paleotropical deposits
Silurian northern paleotropical deposits